Lower Holloway is a district in the London Borough of Islington, London.  The name has fallen out of common use and the area is now generally regarded as being a part of Holloway. The area of Lower Holloway stretches from the South of Holloway Road to the Central side of Holloway, Nags Head. It is wholly in the N7 postal district.

Areas of London
Districts of the London Borough of Islington